Guido Dumarey (born in 1959) is a Belgian serial entrepreneur, specialized in (automotive) high tech turnarounds.

Punch Powerglide, a motor vehicle automatic transmission plant left by General Motors (GM) in 2012, is situated in Strasbourg, France. Originally scheduled for closure in 2014 with a loss of 1,000 jobs, the plant has since continued to employ 1,350 people, producing 6L40 and 6L45 six-speed automatic transmissions. An investment of 250 million Euro allowed the company to produce the eight-speed 8HP50 automatic transmission for ZF

In December 2015, Dumarey came to prominence in Australia, with plans to buy Holden's car manufacturing facilities scheduled to be shut down in 2017. These facilities have been building the Holden Commodore and its derivatives, which are based on the GM Zeta platform and, in V6 configuration, have been using six-speed automatic transmissions produced by Punch Powerglide. As part of his "Project Erich", Dumarey intends continuing to manufacture these large rear-wheel drive cars, as premium local and export products.

References

1959 births
Living people
Belgian business executives
Automotive businesspeople
Belgian racing drivers
Nürburgring 24 Hours drivers
24H Series drivers